Velyka Komyshuvakha is a village (selo) of Ukraine, in Izium Raion, Kharkiv Oblast. Velyka Komyshuvakha belongs to Barvinkove urban hromada, one of the hromadas of Ukraine. It has a population of 882.

History 
During the Holodomor, 389 residents of the village died.

On June 12, 2020, according to the Order of the Cabinet of Ministers of Ukraine No. 725-r "On Determining Administrative Centers and Approval of Territories of Territorial Communities of Kharkiv Region," it became part of the Barvinkivska urban community.

Until 18 July 2020, Velyka Komyshuvakha belonged to Barvinkove Raion. The raion was abolished in July 2020 as part of the administrative reform of Ukraine, which reduced the number of raions of Kharkiv Oblast to seven. The area of Barvinkove Raion was merged into Izium Raion.

References 

Villages in Izium Raion
Izyumsky Uyezd
Webarchive template wayback links